The German Völkisch Freedom Party (or DVFP) was an early right wing and anti-Semitic political party of Weimar Germany that took its name from the Völkisch movement, a populist movement focused on folklore and the German Volk.

The DVFP was founded on 16 December 1922, when Wilhelm Henning, Reinhold Wulle and Albrecht von Graefe broke from the German National People's Party (DNVP). Leading right-wing figures such as Ernst Graf zu Reventlow, Artur Dinter and Theodor Fritsch joined the party on its foundation. Many members of the Deutschvölkischer Schutz- und Trutzbund joined the DVFP after the former was banned.

After the Nazi Party was banned in the wake of the Beer Hall Putsch, the DVFP entered into an electoral alliance with many Nazis to form the National Socialist Freedom Movement in early 1924, a move endorsed by Erich Ludendorff and encouraged by Graefe, who hoped to gain control of the far right as a whole. However this alliance was not a success, plans for a full merger fell through in August 1924 and Graefe and Wulle re-formed the DVFP, now named the German Völkisch Freedom Movement, as a rival to the Nazi Party in February 1925.

References

Political parties established in 1922
Political parties in the Weimar Republic
Far-right political parties in Germany
Political parties disestablished in 1925
1922 establishments in Germany
German nationalist political parties
Banned political parties in Germany
Banned far-right parties